Moustafa Laham (born 21 October 1929) was a Lebanese weightlifter. He competed in the men's middleweight event at the 1952 Summer Olympics.

References

1929 births
Living people
Lebanese male weightlifters
Olympic weightlifters of Lebanon
Weightlifters at the 1952 Summer Olympics
Place of birth missing (living people)
20th-century Lebanese people